West Alexander Historic District is a historic district in West Alexander, Pennsylvania.

It is designated as a historic district by the Washington County History & Landmarks Foundation.

References

Houses on the National Register of Historic Places in Pennsylvania
Italianate architecture in Pennsylvania
Historic districts in Washington County, Pennsylvania
Houses in Washington County, Pennsylvania
Historic districts on the National Register of Historic Places in Pennsylvania
National Register of Historic Places in Washington County, Pennsylvania